Masi Periyannasamy, also known as Kollimalai Masi Periasamy, is a deity and kuladevam of the Hindu people.

Regional Hindu gods